Charles C. Paine (August 13, 1824 – February 16, 1907) was a member of the Wisconsin State Assembly.

Biography
Paine was born on August 13, 1824 in Chardon, Ohio. His father was James Harvey Paine (1791–1879). James was a general in the state militia. The younger Paine died in 1907 and was buried at Forest Home Cemetery in Milwaukee, Wisconsin.

Assembly career
Paine was a member of the Assembly during the 1880 session. He was a Republican.

References

External links

People from Chardon, Ohio
Politicians from Milwaukee
Republican Party members of the Wisconsin State Assembly
1824 births
1907 deaths
Burials in Wisconsin
19th-century American politicians